Eliza Iulia Buceschi (born 1 August 1993) is a Romanian handballer for Rapid București and the Romanian national team.

Career

Club
She was the best scorer with 100 goals of the Liga Naţională's 2011–12 season until a surgery on a broken finger in her right hand, ruled her out for the rest of the season starting with the month of February.

She ranked second in the 2012–2013 Cupa României's top goalscorers list.

International
In July 2012 Buceschi returned participating at the 2012 Women's Junior World Handball Championship in the Czech Republic where she finished fifth on the top scorers' list with 58 goals.

She also participated at the 2011 Women's 19 European Handball Championship in the Netherlands where she finished third on the top scorers' list with 55 goals.

Eliza Buceschi is also a member of the Romanian national team, after she made her debut on 19 October 2011 against Portugal scoring 4 goals.

In December 2018, Buceschi finished as second top scorer at the 2018 Handball Championship.

Achievements
Liga Naţională:
Winner: 2014, 2022
Cupa României:
Winner: 2013, 2014, 2015
Supercupa României:
Winner: 2013, 2014
Bundesliga Frauen:
Winner: 2016

Individual awards
 Romanian Hope of the Year: 2011
 HCM Baia Mare's Player of the Year: 2011
 Best Young Player of the EHF Champions League: 2015
 Handball-Planet.com World Young Female Left Back: 2014–15

References

External links

 

1993 births
Living people
Sportspeople from Baia Mare
Romanian female handball players
FCM Håndbold players
SCM Râmnicu Vâlcea (handball) players
CS Minaur Baia Mare (women's handball) players
Expatriate handball players
Romanian expatriate sportspeople in Denmark
Romanian expatriate sportspeople in Germany
Handball players at the 2016 Summer Olympics
Olympic handball players of Romania